The 1960 College Football All-America team is composed of college football players who were selected as All-Americans by various organizations and writers that chose College Football All-America Teams in 1960. The six selectors recognized by the NCAA as "official" for the 1960 season are (1) the American Football Coaches Association (AFCA), (2) the Associated Press (AP), (3) the Football Writers Association of America (FWAA), (4) the Newspaper Enterprise Association (NEA), (5) the Sporting News, and (6) the United Press International (UPI).

Seven players, including 1960 Heisman Trophy winner Joe Bellino of Navy, and College and Pro Football Hall of Fame inductees Mike Ditka of Pitt and Bob Lilly of TCU, were unanimously named first-team All-Americans by all six official selectors.

Consensus All-Americans
For the year 1960, the NCAA recognizes six published All-American teams as "official" designations for purposes of its consensus determinations. The following chart identifies the NCAA-recognized consensus All-Americans and displays which first-team designations they received.

All-American selections for 1960

Ends
 Mike Ditka, Pittsburgh 
 Dan LaRose, Missouri 
 Bill Miller, Miami (FL) 
 Claude Moorman, Duke 
 Marlin McKeever, USC 
 Johnny Brewer, Ole Miss 
 Fred Mautino, Syracuse

Tackles
 Bob Lilly, TCU  
 Ken Rice, Auburn 
 Merlin Olsen, Utah State 
 Jerry Beabout, Purdue 
Kurt Gegner, Washington 
Bob DeMarco, Dayton 
Joe Rutgens, Illinois

Guards
 Tom Brown, Minnesota  
 Joe Romig, Colorado 
 Mark Manders, Iowa 
 Ben Balme, Yale 
 Wayne Harris, Arkansas 
 Al Vanderbush, Army 
 Myron Pottios, Notre Dame 
 Pat Dye, Georgia 
Rufus King, Rice 
Monte Lee, Texas

Centers
 E. J. Holub, Texas Tech
 Roy McKasson, Washington 
 Tom Goode, Mississippi State 
 Wayne Harris, Arkansas

Quarterbacks
 Jake Gibbs, Mississippi 
 Roman Gabriel, N.C. State 
 Norm Snead, Wake Forest 
 Tom Matte, Ohio State

Halfbacks
 Joe Bellino, Navy  
 Ernie Davis, Syracuse  
 Billy Kilmer, UCLA 
 Pervis Atkins, New Mexico State 
 John Hadl, Kansas 
 Larry Ferguson, Iowa 
 Tommy Mason, Tulane 
 Ronnie Bull, Baylor 
 Lance Alworth, Arkansas 
 Wilburn Hollis, Iowa

Fullbacks
 Bob Ferguson, Ohio State  
 Ed Dyas, Auburn 
 Tom Watkins, Iowa State 
 Mike Stock, Northwestern

Key
 Bold – Consensus All-American
 -1 – First-team selection
 -2 – Second-team selection
 -3 – Third-team selection

Official selectors
 AFCA = American Football Coaches Association, "selected on the basis of balloting by more than 1,500 members of the coaches' association", sponsored by Eastman Kodak Company and distributed exclusively by the United Press International
 AP = Associated Press
FWAA = Football Writers Association of America
 NEA = Newspaper Enterprise Association
 TSN = Sporting News
 UPI = United Press International. "Chosen by the ballots of a record number of 402 sports writers and broadcasters from all parts of the nation ..."

Other selectors
 CP = Central Press Association
 Time = Time magazine
 WC = Walter Camp Football Foundation

See also
 1960 All-Atlantic Coast Conference football team
 1960 All-Big Eight Conference football team
 1960 All-Big Ten Conference football team
 1960 All-Pacific Coast football team
 1960 All-SEC football team
 1960 All-Southwest Conference football team

References

All-America Team
College Football All-America Teams